The Mackay Gas Turbine is a remote-controlled power generator that is operated for short periods when customer demand for electricity is high. The gas turbine's ability to start quickly is important in ensuring a secure, reliable power supply for distribution to consumers.

It was commissioned in 1975 and recently underwent refurbishment to ensure continued reliable operations.

The Rolls-Royce Olympus 34 MW gas turbine runs on LFO and has black start capability.

This power station is now decommissioned and off the National energy market (NEM).

See also

List of power stations in Queensland

References

External links 
Stanwell Corporation fact sheet on the Mackay Gas Turbine

Natural gas-fired power stations in Queensland
Buildings and structures in Mackay, Queensland
Mackay, Queensland